Travancore Sisters refers to the trio of Lalitha,  Padmini and Ragini who were actresses, dancers and performers in  Malayalam, Tamil, Telugu, Hindi and Kannada films.

The Travancore sisters learned dancing under Guru Gopinath and Guru T. K. Mahalingam Pillai. Ragini died from cancer in 1976 and Lalitha in 1982. Padmini died in 2006. Few documents relating to them survived except for dozens of films and articles in Indian newspapers. The Travancore Sisters grew up in a joint family tharavadu 'Malaya Cottage' in Poojappura, Thiruvananthapuram. The Travancore sisters were nieces of the famous beauty Narayani Pillai Kunjamma, who spurned the king of Travancore in favour of marrying the aristocratic landowner Kesava Pillai of Kandamath and through her related to the actress Sukumari's mother Sathyabhama Amma and the Travancore Royal Family through cousin, Ambika. They came to be known as the Travancore sisters.
Uday Shankar called the sisters to Chennai (then Madras) to act in a film based on dance which he was planning to make . Padmini and her sisters were disciples of the noted Indian dancer Guru Gopinath .

The matriarchial head of the family was Karthyayini Amma whose husband was Palakunnathu Krishna Pillai of Cherthala alias 'Penang Padmanabha Pillai' or P K Pillai, who had  had six sons of whom Satyapalan Nair (Baby) was a leading producer of many early Malayalam films. Another son, Raveendran Nair's daughter Latika Suresh, is a leading producer of Malayalam TV programs. They performed at the 1955 Filmfare Awards.

Filmography
Dance and musical drama performances in films.

References

Actresses from Thiruvananthapuram
Indian film actresses
Actresses in Tamil cinema
Actresses in Telugu cinema
Actresses in Kannada cinema
Actresses in Malayalam cinema